United Nations General Assembly Resolution 273 was adopted on May 11, 1949, during the second part of the third session of the United Nations General Assembly, to admit the State of Israel to membership in the United Nations. It was passed following the approval of UN Security Council Resolution 69 on March 4, 1949.

The Resolution passed by the requisite two-thirds majority, the vote in the General Assembly being 37 in favour to 12 against, with 9 abstentions.

Debates and Discussions

In the debates about UN resolution 273 in 1949 about Israel's admittance to the UN, Israel's UN representative Abba Eban promised that the state would honor its obligations under resolution 181 and Resolution 194. El Salvador's representative asked:

Eban replied:

Full text of the resolution

Voting Results 

The result of the voting was the following:
 
Approve

Argentina, Australia, Bolivia, Byelorussian SSR, Canada, Chile, China, Colombia, Costa Rica, Cuba, Czechoslovakia, Dominican Republic, Ecuador, France, Guatemala, Haiti, Honduras, Iceland, Liberia, Luxembourg, Mexico, Netherlands, New Zealand, Nicaragua, Norway, Panama, Paraguay, Peru, Philippines, Poland, South Africa, Ukrainian SSR, USSR, United States, Uruguay, Venezuela, Yugoslavia.

Reject

Afghanistan, Burma, Egypt, Ethiopia, India, Iran, Iraq, Lebanon, Pakistan, Saudi Arabia, Syria, Yemen.

Abstentions

Belgium, Brazil, Denmark, El Salvador, Greece, Siam, Sweden, Turkey, United Kingdom.

References 

 Full text of the Resolution, in English and French (pdf)
 Official record of the 207th Plenary Meeting of the General Assembly, 11 May 1949

See also 
 List of the UN resolutions concerning Israel
 UN General Assembly Resolution 181
 UN General Assembly Resolution 194

United Nations General Assembly resolutions concerning Israel
0273
1949 in law
1949 in Israel
1949 in the United Nations
May 1949 events
Israeli–Palestinian conflict and the United Nations